Luo Xia (born July 14, 1992) is a Chinese baseball pitcher who plays with the Sichuan Dragons in the China Baseball League. 

Li represented China at the 2012 Asia Series, 2012 Asian Baseball Championship, 2013 East Asian Games, 2013 World Baseball Classic, 2014 Asian Games, 2015 Asian Baseball Championship,  and 2017 World Baseball Classic.

References

1992 births
Living people
2013 World Baseball Classic players
2017 World Baseball Classic players
Chinese baseball players
Baseball pitchers
Sichuan Dragons players
Baseball players at the 2014 Asian Games
Asian Games competitors for China